Kartellen (English: The Cartel) was a Swedish gangsta rap hip hop group founded in 2008 by Kinesen and Babyface, who are both serving life sentences in Finland for accessory to murder. Kinesen was also allegedly involved in an infamous airport multi-million robbery in 2002.

The band used the materials sent by Kinesen with Babyface and others in prison and released them for downloads. It was fronted by Sebbe Staxx (real name Sebastian Stakset), Kaka, Maskinisten. Other members joining later included Lil' Star and Lani Mo Cribbe. Established musicians and producers also contributed to the effort.

Kartellen has been a famous and provocative hip hop act portraying crime and social problems in the suburbs in their albums and mixtapes. It has coverage in mainstream media with some of their releases appearing in the Sverigetopplistan, the official Swedish Singles Chart.

Kartellen concerts were closely monitored by the Swedish police for their controversiality. Sebbe Staxx, with a 1-year prison record for charges related to robbery, receipt of stolen goods and weapon-related charges allegedly sent threatening messages on Twitter about the Swedish far-right politician Jimmie Åkesson who filed a complaint with the police. Sebbe Staxx later apologized to his mom and employer about his choice of words.

Discography

Albums

Mixtapes
2009: Kartellen är här
2009: Programrebeller
2011: Reflektion
2012: Blodspakt

Singles

Other (non charting)
2009: "Gå Loss" (with Lazee and Adam Tensta)
2010: "Bort med alliansen" (produced by Mack Beats)

Notes

References

External links
Kartellen page with Jerry Solfeldt Productions
Facebook
Myspace

Swedish hip hop groups
Gangsta rap groups
Swedish-language singers
Musical groups disestablished in 2015
Musical groups established in 2008